Bad Trip may refer to:
 Bad trip, a frightening and unpleasant experience triggered by psychoactive drugs
 Bad Trip (film), a 2020 comedy film starring Eric Andre
 Bad Trip (song), a song by Jhené Aiko

See also 
 Bad Acid Trip, an American metal band